Glymidine sodium (INN, also known as glycodiazine; trade name Gondafon) is a sulfonamide antidiabetic drug, structurally related to the sulfonylureas. It was first reported in 1964, and introduced to clinical use in Europe in the mid to late 1960s.

References 

Sulfonamides
Pyrimidines
Ethers
Phenol ethers
Abandoned drugs